The United Nations Convention on Transparency in Treaty-based Investor-State Arbitration (also known as the Mauritius Convention on Transparency) is a multilateral treaty that was concluded in 2014 and entered into force in 2017. As of September 2018, it has been ratified by five states: Cameroon, Canada, Gambia, Mauritius, and Switzerland.

The treaty was adopted on 10 December 2014 by United Nations General Assembly resolution 69/116 during the sixty-ninth session of the General Assembly. It has been signed by 22 states. It entered into force on 18 October 2017 after it had been ratified by its third state.

External links
UNCITRAL information page
Ratification status

2014 in New York City
Arbitration treaties
Treaties concluded in 2014
Treaties entered into force in 2017
Treaties of Cameroon
Treaties of Canada
Treaties of the Gambia
Treaties of Mauritius
Treaties of Switzerland
Treaties adopted by United Nations General Assembly resolutions